Forton is a civil parish in the Wyre district of Lancashire, England.  It contains 25 listed buildings that are recorded in the National Heritage List for England.  All the listed buildings are designated at Grade II, the lowest of the three grades, which is applied to "buildings of national importance and special interest".  The parish contains the village of Forton, and is otherwise mainly rural.  The Lancaster Canal passes through the parish, and two bridges crossing it are listed.  Also passing through the parish is the M6 motorway, and tower and former restaurant at Lancaster (Forton) Services are listed.  The other listed buildings include houses and cottages, farmhouses and farm buildings, churches and associated structures, a medieval cross base, milestones, boundary stones, a war memorial, and a former school.


Buildings

References

Citations

Sources

Lists of listed buildings in Lancashire
Buildings and structures in the Borough of Wyre